Vanisher (Telford Porter) is a fictional character and mutant supervillain appearing in American comic books published by Marvel Comics. Vanisher's primary ability is teleportation. He is usually depicted as an opponent of the X-Men. The character was created by Stan Lee and Jack Kirby, and first appeared in The X-Men #2 (November 1963).

The character made his animated television debut in Wolverine and the X-Men, his live-action cinematic debut in Deadpool 2, in which he was portrayed by Brad Pitt, and his video game debut in The Amazing Spider-Man: Web of Fire.

Publication history

The Vanisher first appeared in The X-Men #2 (November 1963), created by writer Stan Lee and artist Jack Kirby.

Fictional character biography
Born in Milton, Massachusetts, the Vanisher is a mutant and a professional criminal with the ability to teleport to any place imaginable. He commits a series of spectacular crimes including: building a large criminal organization, stealing confidential defense plans and attempting to extort millions of dollars from the U.S. government. With support from a large group of non-mutant followers, he goes to the front lawn of the White House to await his payment. Professor Xavier and the X-Men are able to intervene when Xavier induces amnesia upon the Vanisher. Forgetting his powers, the Vanisher is taken into police custody and the X-Men defeat the Vanisher's mob.

The Vanisher regains his memory and joins Factor Three, a subversive organization of mutants who seek world domination. Factor Three attempts to start World War III between the United States and the Soviet Union. The Mutant Master, leader of Factor Three, is revealed to be an alien of the Siris race with a plan to conquer Earth. The rest of Factor Three, including the Vanisher, team up with the X-Men to defeat him. The Vanisher is later held prisoner by the Sentinels, but is saved by the X-Men.

The Vanisher disappears for a period, but comes out of hiding to fight the Champions by joining the Brotherhood of Mutants and using reprogrammed Sentinels. He is defeated by the Champions and is trapped in mid-teleportation by Darkstar. The Darkforce strands half of him in another dimension, with the other half in Poughkeepsie, New York where he is found by the X-Men. When Nightcrawler touches him they become stranded in another dimension. After returning to Earth, the Vanisher organizes a group of young mutant thieves, known as the Fallen Angels. Eventually the Fallen Angels disband, and the Vanisher is left to his own devices. Later, he joins a group of villains to challenge the Fantastic Four but is defeated.

The Vanisher withdraws again until he is mentally controlled by Asylum to attack the New Warriors and other superheroes. Darkling, a superhuman who uses energies from the Darkforce Dimension, is defeated and the Vanisher regains his free will. He later joins a second incarnation of the Enforcers, called the New Enforcers. Along with Eel and a woman named Blitz, the Vanisher is part of the Outer Circle of the Enforcers that becomes involved in a clash between the criminal organizations A.I.M. and HYDRA. The New Enforcers are confronted and eventually defeated by Spider-Man.

X-Teams
The Vanisher seeks to understand his powers in greater detail. He visits the Darkforce Dimension, resulting in his capture by its inhabitants. He is forced to read them stories until he is rescued by X-Force's Warpath, who had been manipulated into performing the mission.

The Vanisher resurfaces as a leader of a South American drug cartel, which is producing and distributing drugs such as mutant growth hormone throughout the Americas. Stacy X, Iceman and Archangel are instrumental in stopping his North American operations.

X-Force
The Vanisher is one of the few mutants that retained their superhuman powers after M-Day. Hired to steal a vial of the long-thought-destroyed Legacy Virus from one of Mr. Sinister's labs, he resurfaces in Japan. Cyclops ordered X-Force to recover it at all costs. In a confrontation with X-Force, the Vanisher is injured and given a terminal brain tumor by Elixir, in order to secure his co-operation in retrieving the virus. He transports the team to one of the bases, only to be attacked by clones of the Marauders and soldiers of The Right, under command of the resurrected Cameron Hodge. During the battle, he teleports away, and is later forcibly inducted into the ranks of X-Force for use as transport and extraction.

When the Sapien League starts abducting mutants and infecting them with a modified version of the Legacy Virus, the Vanisher teams with Warpath. While at an anti-mutant rally, he tries to get Warpath to leave with him, offering to take him to a brothel in Portugal only to be told to be ready in case anything bad happened. He teleports X-Force to the Leper Queen and manages to disarm her before being sent into the future by Cyclops.

Messiah War
Upon arriving in the future, the Vanisher tries to teleport but his powers are blocked. He is then shot in the neck by Deadpool. After being healed by Elixir, Wolverine makes him stay in front of the group in case there are more snipers. When ambushed by Stryfe's forces, the Vanisher is ordered by Wolverine to protect Elixir and Hope Summers. After defeating Stryfe's forces, the Vanisher, Domino, X-23 and Deadpool investigate what has been blocking his powers and their time-travel devices. During this time he begins showing signs of serious illness. Together with Laura they find the problem is Kiden Nixon. The Vanisher tries to convince Domino to commit a mercy killing but Laura has difficulty with the situation. When the timers run out, Domino kills Kiden but they're left wondering why they didn't automatically return to their present. When the Vanisher removes his timer he instantly appears in the present at the ruins of the Xavier Institute.

Necrosha
Returning from the future, the Vanisher's condition worsens. He teleports to Utopia for help and finds himself in the middle of the battle between Selene's forces and the X-Men. Cyclops rescues him from an attack by Tarot and is ordered to take Emma Frost to safety. Before the Vanisher can react, they're attacked by Banshee. He then teleports to the medical lab to search for Elixir. Finding Elixir in a coma, the Vanisher watches over him until Josh awakens. He asks for the tumor to be removed but was told to teleport X-Force to Genosha. There, Elixir reveals he removed the tumor in the future and that the Vanisher is actually suffering from stage-4 syphilis. Elixir tells him to leave because that's what he's good at and the Vanisher teleports into Selene's fortress to rescue Warpath. He engages in a battle with Blink, who teleports his arm off. Rescuing the other members of X-Force and getting them to safety, the Vanisher tells Elixir that Warpath was always nice to him and demands to be healed.

During the final confrontation with Selene and her Inner Circle, he works alongside Archangel and Domino in taking out Blink. Once the mission is over, the Vanisher and Domino go to Brazil for some rest and relaxation.

Second Coming
Upon Cable and Hope Summers return to the present, Cyclops orders Domino and the Vanisher to wait in San Francisco. Learning that Bastion was targeting teleporters to prevent the reunion of the so-called "Mutant Messiah" with the X-Men, Cyclops gives Domino instructions to bring the Vanisher back to Utopia. Hearing this, the Vanisher teleports to his hideout in Portugal only to find his girls dead and Steven Lang and his men awaiting him. The Vanisher is then shot multiple times before teleporting away, being left for dead in the middle of nowhere. After this, the X-Men consider him missing in action.

Regenesis
The Vanisher appears in New York as a member of a group of Marauders that are brainwashed to attack the X-Men.

The Vanisher is later found by Juggernaut and is coerced into taking him to where the Gem of Cyttorak is located.

As part of the 2016 "Marvel NOW!" branding, the Vanisher later begins smuggling stolen vibranium out of Wakanda in order to sell it to criminals. He is defeated by Kasper Cole and taken into custody.

Vanisher later joins the Hellfire club with Emma Frost as its Black King, but is killed by Robert Callahan.

Powers and abilities
The Vanisher is a mutant that possesses the ability to teleport himself, his clothes, and an undetermined amount of additional mass. Apparently, the Vanisher traverses the Darkforce Dimension when teleporting from one place on Earth to another. His power appears to be psionic in nature. The limits on the Vanisher's teleportation range and the maximum amount of mass he can teleport with himself are unknown, but he was able to teleport himself and several others from southern California to New York without any visible strain. The Vanisher has a subconscious extrasensory ability that prevents him from materializing part or all of his body within a solid object, even if he has never before been to the area he is teleporting to. This allows the Vanisher to teleport with greater ease than Nightcrawler. His powers once interacted with those of Nightcrawler, sending them both into alternate dimensions.

The Vanisher has used guns which shoot gas or energy beams. He also once reprogrammed Sentinel robots to do his bidding and can fluently speak Portuguese.

Other versions

Age of Apocalypse
In the dark reality known as Age of Apocalypse, the Vanisher was part of Apocalypse's supremacist rulership. He was ordered to retrieve Magneto's child while Apocalypse kept the X-Men's leader busy. The Vanisher was able to locate Charles Lensherr in the Morlock Tunnels, but he was in the possession of the robotic French maid Nanny who killed the Vanisher to protect the baby Charles.

House of M
In the "House of M" reality, the Vanisher works with Pyro under the authority of Exodus as part of the mutant supremacist rulership of Australia. They are opposed by the Hulk who is mad that his native friends have been harassed.

Exiles
An alternate reality Vanisher appeared in Exiles and demonstrated the ability to teleport from the Earth to a station in space.

Ultimate Marvel
In the Ultimate Marvel universe, the Vanisher is a member of the Brotherhood terrorist cell raided by Captain America and the Ultimates in Ultimate War. He later reappears as a member of the Brotherhood.

In other media

Television
The Vanisher appears in the animated series Wolverine and the X-Men, voiced by Steve Blum. This version is a member of Professor X's future X-Men. First appearing in the episode "Future X", he assists Berzerker in rescuing Professor X and other mutant prisoners from a Mutant Response Division camp before helping them in various missions to stop Master Mold. The present version of the Vanisher makes a cameo appearance in the episode "Aces and Eights" as a Genoshan prisoner.

Film
The Vanisher makes a cameo appearance in the live-action film Deadpool 2, portrayed by Brad Pitt. This version has the mutant ability of invisibility instead of teleportation and Deadpool and Weasel recruit him into X-Force. However, Vanisher is killed on the first mission after colliding with a power line.

Video games
The Vanisher appears in The Amazing Spider-Man: Web of Fire. This version is a member of the New Enforcers.

References

External links
 Vanisher at Marvel.com
 UncannyXmen.net Spotlight on Vanisher

Characters created by Jack Kirby
Characters created by Stan Lee
Comics characters introduced in 1963
Deadpool characters
Fictional characters from Massachusetts
Fictional characters who can manipulate darkness or shadows
Fictional characters who can turn invisible
Marvel Comics characters who can teleport
Marvel Comics film characters
Marvel Comics male supervillains
Marvel Comics mutants
X-Men supporting characters